José Rivera (born March 24, 1955) is a playwright and the first Puerto Rican screenwriter to be nominated for an Oscar.

Early years
Rivera was born in the Santurce section of San Juan, Puerto Rico in 1955. He was raised in Arecibo where he lived until 1959. Rivera's family migrated from Puerto Rico when he was 5 years old, and moved to New York City. They settled down in Long Island, whose small town environment would be of an influence to him in the future. His father was a taxi driver, he said  "...for a long time I just wanted to do better than him...so for years I wanted to be a bus driver." His parents were very religious and he grew up in a household whose only book was the Bible. His family enjoyed telling stories and he learned a lot by hearing these stories.  As a child, he also enjoyed watching The Twilight Zone and The Outer Limits T.V. series. He received his primary and secondary education in the New York state public school system. In 1968, when Rivera was 12 years old, he saw a traveling company perform the play "Rumpelstiltskin" at his school. Witnessing the collective reaction of the audience towards the play convinced the young Rivera that someday, he too, would like to write plays.

Career
Many of his plays have been produced across the nation and even translated into several languages, including: The House of Ramon Iglesias, Cloud Tectonics, The Street of the Sun, Sonnets for an Old Century, Sueño, Giants Have Us in Their Books, References to Salvador Dalí Make Me Hot and  Adoration of the Old Woman.  In 2003, Cloud Tectonics was presented in the XLII Festival of Puerto Rican Theater, an event sponsored by the Puerto Rican Institute of Culture, in San Juan. Rivera helped found the Los Angeles-based theater company, The Wilton Project.

Television
Rivera contributed as a writer to the following shows: ‘’a.k.a.Pablo’’ (1984) (TV series), The House of Ramon Iglesias (1986) (TV), Family Matters (1989) (TV series), Goosebumps (1995) (TV series), The Jungle Book: Mowgli's Story (1998), Night Visions (2001) (TV series) and the "Harmony" segment of Shadow Realm (2002). He also co-created and co-produced the NBC-TV series, Eerie, Indiana with Karl Schaefer.

TV appearances
Rivera was featured in The Dialogue interview series. In this 90 minute interview with producer Mike DeLuca, Rivera describes his transition from playwright to Oscar-nominated screenwriter.

The Motorcycle Diaries
In 2002, Rivera was hired to write the screenplay for the film Diarios de Motocicleta (The Motorcycle Diaries) by director Walter Salles. The movie, which was released in 2004, is based on Che Guevara's diary about a motorcycle trip which he and Alberto Granado had, and how it changed their lives. In January 2005, Rivera became the first Puerto Rican to be nominated by the Academy of Motion Picture Arts and Sciences for "Best Adapted Screenplay" for the film. His screenplay won awards from the Cinema Writers Circle (Spain) and from the Argentine Film Critics Association; it was also nominated for awards by the American Screenwriters Association, the Online Film Critics Society, and the Writers Guild of America.

This work with the subject of Che Guevara later led Rivera to write and perform a play entitled School of the Americas which focuses on Che's last few hours alive. The play starring John Ortiz as Che, imagines Che's final conversations, mainly with a young and fairly naive female schoolteacher, in the one-room village schoolhouse where he is imprisoned before his execution. The play was featured in New York City 2006-2007 and later San Francisco 2008.

Influences
In high school and later in college, he read everything that had to do with Shakespeare, Ibsen and Molière. His education was directed towards the Anglo-Euro Cultures, without receiving any exposure to the literature and writers of Latin America. However, he was profoundly influenced later by a Latin American novel, One Hundred Years of Solitude by 1982 Nobel Prize winner Gabriel García Márquez. Márquez later became his mentor at the Sundance Institute.

Rivera incorporates many of his life experiences into his plays. In The Promise and Each Day Dies With Sleep, Rivera discusses his experiences as a Puerto Rican in a small American town, with an emphasis on family, sexuality, spirituality and the occult.  Marisol was inspired by the situation of his homeless uncle.

Awards and honors
Rivera has won two Obie Awards for playwriting, a Kennedy Center Fund for New American plays Grant, a Fulbright Arts Fellowship in playwriting, a Whiting Award, a McKnight Fellowship, the 2005 Norman Lear Writing Award, a 2005 Impact Award and a Berilla Kerr Playwriting Award.

Currently
His play, "Brainpeople," premiered in San Francisco January 30, 2008, and was co-produced by the American Conservatory Theater.  Rivera will also direct and write the screenplay for "Celestina", a film loosely adapted from his play "Cloud Tectonics", which will be produced by Walter Salles.  Among his recent projects is the movie adaptation of On the Road, based on the novel by Jack Kerouac.

Plays
 The House of Ramon Iglesia (1983)
 The Promise (1988)
 Each Day Dies With Sleep (1990)
 Marisol (1992)
 Tape (1993)
 Flowers (1994)
 Giants Have Us In Their Books (1997)
 Cloud Tectonics (1995)
 Maricela De La Luz Lights The World
 Godstuff
 Adoration of the Old Woman
 The Street of the Sun (1996)
 Sueno (1998)
 Lovers of Long Red Hair (2000)
 References to Salvador Dalí Make Me Hot (2000)
 Sonnets for an Old Century (2000)
 School of the Americas (2006)
 Massacre (Sing To Your Children) (2007)
 Brainpeople (2008)
 Boleros for the Disinchanted (2008), world premiere Yale Repertory Theatre
 Human Emotional Process (2008), commissioned by McCarter Theatre
 Pablo and Andrew at the Altar of Words (2010)
 Golden (2010)
 The Kiss of the Spider Woman (translation) (2010)
 The Hours are Feminine (2011)
 Lessons for an Unaccustomed Bride (2011) 
 The Book of Fishes (2011)  
 Another Word for Beauty (2012), musical, music and lyrics by Héctor Buitrago, book by Rivera, production of The Civilians
 Written on my Face (2012) 
 Another Word for Beauty (2013) 
 The Last Book of Homer (2013) 
 The Garden of Tears and Kisses (2014) 
 Sermon for the Senses (2014) 
 Charlotte (2014)
 The Untranslatable Secrets of Nikki Corona

Many of these plays are published by Broadway Play Publishing Inc.

Bibliography of Scholarly Criticism
Toward a Rhetoric of Sociospatial Theatre: José Rivera's Marisol By: J. Chris Westgate, Theatre Journal, 2007  March; 59 (1): 21–37.
Split Personality: Random Thoughts on Writing for Theater and Film By: José Rivera, Cinema Journal, 2006 Winter; 45 (2): 89–92.
The Motorcycle Diaries By: Yon Motskin, Creative Screenwriting, 2005 January-Feb; 12 (1): 89.
'An Urgent Voice for Our Times': An Interview with José Rivera By: Caridad Svich, Contemporary Theatre Review: An International Journal, 2004  November; 14 (4): 83–89.
Die Imaginierung ethnischer Weltsicht im neueren amerikanischen Drama By: Herbert Grabes, IN: Schlote and Zenzinger, New Beginnings in Twentieth-Century Theatre and Drama: Essays in Honour of Armin Geraths. Trier, Germany: Wissenschaftlicher; 2003. pp. 327–44
José Rivera By: Miriam Chirico, IN: Wheatley, Twentieth-Century American Dramatists, Third Series. Detroit, MI: Thomson Gale; 2002. pp. 281–301
Marisol, Angels, and Apocalyptic Migrations By: Jon D. Rossini, American Drama, 2001 Summer; 10 (2): 1-20.
An Interview with Jose Rivera By: Norma Jenckes, American Drama, 2001 Summer; 10 (2): 21–47.
Dream Editor By: Stephanie Coen, American Theatre, 1996  December; 13 (10): 26.
Exile and Otherness: Examples from Three Continents By: Phyllis Zatlin, Hispanofila, 1993  January; 107: 33–41.
Poverty and Magic in Each Day Dies with Sleep By: José Rivera, Studies in American Drama, 1945–present, 1992; 7 (1): 163–232.
An Interview with José Rivera By: Lynn Jacobson, Studies in American Drama, 1945–present, 1991; 6 (1): 49–58.

See also
List of Puerto Ricans
On the Road (2012 film)
List of Puerto Ricans in the Academy Awards
List of Puerto Rican writers
Puerto Rican literature
Pacific Playwrights Festival

References

External links

Profile at The Whiting Foundation
The Dialogue: Learn from the Masters Interview
Diction and Contradiction by Michael Feingold, Village Voice, July 4, 2006
Jose Rivera's Che Guevara Play: "School of the Americas" by Delfin Vigil, January 20, 2008
Book Rags
http://articles.latimes.com/1995-03-02/entertainment/ca-37615_1_ramon-iglesia

1955 births
Living people
American male screenwriters
American television producers
American television writers
Puerto Rican dramatists and playwrights
Puerto Rican male writers
Denison University alumni
People from San Juan, Puerto Rico
American male television writers
American male dramatists and playwrights
American dramatists and playwrights
Hispanic and Latino American dramatists and playwrights